Gospel for Asia (now GFA World) is an independent Christian missionary and humanitarian organization, founded by K. P. Yohannan in 1979, focusing on residents of Asian countries and small parts of Africa. The organization is located about five miles southwest of Wills Point, Texas, a small community east of Dallas,Texas. It is affiliated with the Believers Eastern Church.

GFA World is present in India, Bhutan, Sri Lanka, Nepal, Myanmar, Bangladesh, Cambodia, China, Laos Thailand, and Rwanda.

History
In 1981, current president  K.P Yohannan formed a branch of GFA World (known for over 40 years as Gospel for Asia) in his native Kerala, with an Indian headquarters being set up in Tiruvalla in 1983.

The organization has  grown to support various humanitarian and spiritual programs as well as working with outside organizations, including local governments and the Believer's Eastern Church, which owns and operates hospitals, colleges and public and residential schools.

Programs
The goal of GFA focuses on the formation of missionaries native to the region they serve, with special emphasis on Asia. The organization has defined its primary mission field as being those people that live in the 10/40 Window, a rectangular region extending from  West Africa to East Asia.

National missionaries

GFA's main focus is to train and equip national missionaries. Yohannan has stated that he does not limit "national missionaries" to formal nation-states, instead focusing on differences in culture and language to define nationalities. This approach might result in several specialized missionary groups within a single nation-state, from large cities and regions down to small tribes and villages. In 2018 GFA reported that they have over 16,000 missionaries and church planters in 10 Asian nations.

Church buildings, Bibles and gospel literature
Gospel for Asia raises funds for the building of simple Christian worship centers in small villages to educate new disciples as well as provide a visible meeting place for Christians.  However, they have built several large cathedral type buildings in major cities.  Examples are St. Thomas Believers Church Cathedral in Thiruvalla and another in an upscale neighborhood Hauz Khas. GFA states they distribute native-language bibles and evangelical Christian literature to the region.

Radio and television broadcasts
GFA produces the broadcast Radio in Asia, the Athmeeya Yathra (Spiritual Journey) radio programs and Athmeeyayathra Television's YouTube channel, which provides biblical video content.

Bible colleges
GFA states it has 56 bible colleges in India, Nepal, Bangladesh, Myanmar and Sri Lanka with the purpose of training native missionaries with usage of their own dialects and cultures so that leaders could promote gospels. The program includes three years of instruction, including field instruction and experience.

GFA World Child Sponsorships

GFA World maintains a child sponsorship program for poor families in underserved communities, especially lower-caste families. The program offers education, physical and spiritual care, including healthcare training and vocational training for women. In its 2019 Special Report, GFA World had reported that there were 138,000 children enrolled throughout Asia in its child sponsorship program.

Clean Water Wells
GFA digs clean water bore wells in communities where water is scarce during parts or most of the year. These wells are built for long-term use near churches, bible colleges or Bridge of Hope centers, and each well is maintained by a local pastor. These wells provide free, clean water to individuals regardless of caste, class, social designation or religion. In its 2019 Special Report, GFA World reported 4,856 wells were drilled in communities needing clean water and 12,243 BioSand water filters have been provided to individuals or families who only have access to compromised water sources.

Leprosy Ministry
Also called “Reaching Friends Ministry,” the Leprosy Ministry started as a small effort in 2007 to help a few people suffering with the disease. GFA World workers care for the patients through social and relief work, medical aid, and health and hygiene awareness programs.

Expansion to Africa
GFA's work in Africa begins with GFA World Child Sponsorship in the slums of Kigali, the capital of Rwanda. This expansion will also include training national missionaries, clean water projects, medical ministry, education for the underprivileged, women’s empowerment, and community development projects. GFA plans to expand the ministry to six other nations in Africa during the next few years. GFA World in Rwanda will focus on training indigenous workers to serve their native communities.

Disaster relief

Nepal earthquake
Gospel for Asia-supported field partners joined forces with the Nepal government to provide disaster relief in the wake of Nepal’s 2015 Earthquake. The organization helped by providing food, water and medical supplies. Following the initial relief efforts, GFA's founder K.P. Yohannan met with the Prime Minister of Nepal.

Asian water crisis
One of their longest ongoing efforts to date, Gospel for Asia's Jesus Wells provide clean drinking water to Asian villages with insufficient access to safe, clean water sources. By 2018, the organization helped construct almost 7,000 wells and BioSand water filters. The wells are typically maintained by Gospel for Asia-supported pastors or their church members, preventing the wells from breaking down and ensuring they last for up to 2 decades.

Illiteracy and poverty
GFA's Bridge of Hope after-school program assists underprivileged villages through ongoing literacy and education for their boys and girls. This education helps children and their families to overcome generational poverty and avoid the worlds of bonded labor and sex-slave trade. There are more than 600 of these centers. Students at the centers receive daily education and a nutritious meal, school supplies and uniforms as well as free medical care. GFA is using these centers as a way to alleviate the root causes of impoverishment and gender discrimination in Asian countries as well as inhumane child labor practices.

According to reports, in 2018 GFA assisted "more than 70,000 children, free medical services in over 1,200 villages and remote communities, 4,000 wells drilled, 11,000 water filters installed, Christmas gifts for more than 200,000 needy families, and spiritual teaching available in 110 languages in 14 nations through radio ministry".

Kerala Floods
In 2018, flooding in Kerala left over 200,000 Indian people without homes. GFA's primary field partner saw their Kerala headquarters suffer from severe flooding. Many Bridge of Hope centers also suffered damage. But GFA's filed partner volunteers delivered medical supplies, clothes, food and fresh water to flooding victims throughout the area. The estimated recovery time from these floods is five years and GFA-supported filed partners plan to assist for as long as necessary.

Sri Lanka Easter Bombing
GFA also contributed to relief efforts after the Easter bombings in Sri Lanka in April 2019. They provided victims with food and other emergency supplies. One of GFA's supported social workers lost five family members in the bombings. In addition, two bombs were found near GFA-supported offices.

COVID-19 relief
Due to the water crisis and national lockdown in India, leaving home and effective hand washing are not possibilities. In response to the coronavirus, Gospel for Asia is providing clean water projects through BioSand filters and Jesus Wells in order to give clean drinking and hand washing water. They are also partnering with local governments to educate people and improve on hand washing techniques. The organization is also installing toilets and running medical clinics throughout South Asia. GFA partnered with Believers Eastern Church in Asia and local officials to distribute food kits for families suffering from the medical and economic loses due to COVID-19.

Affiliate offices 
GFA has 8 affiliated international entities in which they operate, including Canada, United Kingdom, New Zealand, Australia, South Africa, Germany, Finland, and  South Korea.

Controversies

GFA Diaspora

In 2014, a group of over 10 former Gospel for Asia staff members named the  GFA Diaspora wrote two letters. While their concerns were mostly regarding GFA leadership, there was concerns for GFA's donors.

These letters from former staff, along with their request to meet with the board and discuss the issues, brought about a supposed internal investigation by GFA that was completed by Gayle Erwin, a member of GFA's board. Upon the completion of Erwin's investigation, a report was released.

Erwin later admitted, after resigning from Gospel for Asia's board, that the report was dictated to him by GFA's president and founder Moran Mor Athanasius Yohan Metropolitan (formerly known as K. P. Yohannan) who was displeased with Erwin's actual findings and original report. According to Erwin, "When I first presented the conclusions of my investigation to KP (with David Carroll present) KP glanced at it, declared that he was a speed reader, and began what I will simply call an ugly scene filled with brutal expressions I don’t wish to repeat...". Erwin's report was discarded and a new report was written and given to the board, which was portrayed as Erwin's own report. Erwin wrote a letter to GFA President K.P. Yohannan on 17 March 2015 after seeing the false report. In this letter, he states "I think you are well aware that I cannot agree with this letter except for the generic niceties about wanting biblical reconciliation", and also "I think you exonerate yourself and GFA."

Erwin eventually provided his original report to the GFA Diaspora group, along with an apology for allowing the false report to be distributed.

ECFA Membership
In September 2015, GFA lost their 36-year membership in the financial standards advocacy group Evangelical Council for Financial Accountability (ECFA), with the ECFA reporting that GFA had not met many of their required standards of excellence in financial accountability and governance.

ECFA's report 

The ECFA had been conducting and investigation into Gospel for Asia for four months before releasing the results and revoking the organization's membership. The ECFA states that GFA's membership was "Terminated for failure to comply with"

 Standard 2: Governance
 Standard 3: Financial Oversight
 Standard 4: Use of Resources
 Standard 6: Compensation-Setting and Related-Party Transactions
 Standard 7.1: Truthfulness in Communications
 Standard 7.2: Giver Expectations and Intent

The ECFA also noted in their report that "Certain information provided to ECFA by GFA that was crucial to our review was, at least initially, inaccurate", and also that "Certain pertinent information about the compliance issues was not revealed to ECFA by GFA until late in the review process." Additionally the ECFA stated that "We have learned significant information from sources unrelated to GFA that we should have learned directly from GFA." In the letter revoking GFA's membership, the ECFA listed seventeen concerns.

GFA response 

The GFA board responded with a statement that noted "ECFA's decision was made after conducting a special review of Gospel for Asia, and we respect ECFA's evaluation. Our response was to begin a focused review and to implement the ECFA's recommended improvements".

Class action lawsuit

The group has faced two class-action suits - one in the US and one in Canada over their disbursement of the collected funds; the GFA settled the US case at a cost of $37 million, without any admission of guilt. The motion to certify a class-action lawsuit vs GFA in Canada was dismissed by the Ontario Superior Court of Justice in Toronto in March, 2022.

In 2017 Gospel for Asia was accused by Arkansas couple Garland and Phyllis Murphy of raising funds for charity "while covertly diverting the money to a multimillion-dollar personal empire." The couple filed a class action RICO anti-fraud lawsuit against GFA's president and several GFA leaders, seeking to substantiate GFA's claims of where it spent the money donors gave to the organization. The case was settled after three years of court proceedings in which GFA and the plaintiff agreed "all donations designated for use in the field were ultimately sent to the field". Those entitled to join the class action were those United States residents who donated to Gospel for Asia between the dates of 1 January 2009 and 10 September 2018. Information regarding the lawsuit has been published on the official Murphy v Gospel for Asia website.

That court case states that in 2013, "Despite GFA’s explicit representations that it would spend in the field 100 percent of every dollar donors designated for the field, GFA spent only $14.9 million of $118.6 million on actual relief efforts, instead spending far more on salaries and overhead", according to the complaint. "The Murphys (the plaintiffs), of Bentonville, Arkansas, say that Gospel for Asia raised more than $450 million in donations from the United States alone from 2007 to 2013, much of which Yohannan redirected to his personal empire."

On 4 June 2018 Federal Court Judge Brooks ordered GFA to pay for a Special Master to oversee the gathering of evidence for the discovery phase. Judge Brooks stated, "Therefore, the court finds that the defendants abusive conduct in this case since August constitutes a willful violation of its clear discovery orders." In February 2019 Gospel for Asia lost an appeal denying a stay against discovery.

Brooks noted, "The fundamental question in this case has always been whether these entities have in fact redirected donated money in violation of promises that were made to their donors around the world". Gospel for Asia denied the Plaintiffs' allegations, maintaining all money designated for the field went to the field. GFA denied all misdirection of funds and willful misleading of donors.

At the end of February 2019 a settlement was announced. Gospel for Asia agreed to pay $37 million dollars to refund donations to 200,000 donors. The total also included $12,210,000 in Plaintiff's attorney fees and $750,000 in Plaintiff's attorney's expenses as expressed in the Final Order and Judgment. According to the settlement agreement, "All funds designated to the field were sent to the field and used for ministry purposes; and no Individual Defendant, as defined herein, received any improper personal gain or enrichment from or related to donated funds". Further, in section 9.2.2 of the Settlement agreement it reads, “ The Parties also mutually stipulate that all donations designated for use in the field were ultimately sent to the field."

The settlement agreement also requires that K. P. Yohannan's wife Gisela be removed from the board of the charity for three years and for Garland Murphy, one of the plaintiffs, to be given a seat and another person appointed to the board acceptable to both Murphy and K. P. Yohannan; in addition a subcommittee of the board which will include Murphy but neither Yohannan nor his son, Daniel Punnose, will produce annual reports for the board, the Judge and the lead counsel for three years.

GFA maintains that the settlement is not an acknowledgment of guilt.

GFA UK
In January 2016 the Charity Commission, the non-ministerial government department that regulates registered charities in England and Wales and maintains the Central Register of Charities, was “assessing information provided” about the United Kingdom GFA office. The United Kingdom GFA office remains recognised by them as a registered charity with up-to-date accounts. In the year ending 31 March 2020, they spent £316,000 on fundraising, brought in donations and legacies totaling £1.37 million, and spent £0 on charitable activities.

GFA New Zealand
Gospel for Asia's New Zealand office operated out of space provided to them by the church Calvary Chapel Auckland. Once Calvary Chapel became aware of the controversies stirring in the United States, an investigation into GFA's practices was launched. Finding that the work on the field did not at all resemble what GFA had presented to the church and that many for-profit enterprises were run using donated funds, GFA was told to leave the building and the church ceased supporting the ministry.

GFA World (formerly GFA Canada)
A Canadian class-action lawsuit, which accused the ministry of defrauding or making negligent misstatements to donors, was denied certification in May, 2022. The Ontario Superior Court of Justice found that those who accused GFA World Canada of wrongdoing failed to provide “admissible evidence beyond speculation, conjecture, and allegations of wrongdoing.”

GFA World supports a range of projects across Asia and Africa, from medical camps in remote villages to access to safe drinking water and through GFA World’s child sponsorship program.

Believer's Eastern Church

In 2014, the Believers' Eastern Church purchased the Cheruvally Estate, a 2,268-acre (9.18 km2) rubber estate in Kerala, India as an investment to help fund social work among underdeveloped communities. In mid-2015, the government initially confiscated the land from the Believers' Eastern Church in order to build an airport, but that decision was appealed. After a 3-year long legal battle between the government and the Believers' Eastern Church, it was decided by an Indian High Court that the Believers' Eastern Church has the ownership right of the Cheruvally Estate and the government must pay them for the land if they still choose to build an airport in that location. 

The Times of India has reported that "The Believers [Eastern] Church, founded by Moran Mor Athanasius Yohan Metropolitan (formerly known as K. P. Yohannan), and three NGOs associated with it have been barred from bringing in foreign funds to India with the Ministry of Home Affairs (MHA) canceling their FCRA registrations." As of September 2017, GFA provided the requested documents for review to MHA and "Fr Panthapallil, spokesperson of Believers Church, said though the MHA website has advertised that the registrations of the three organisations are cancelled, "there is a standing revision order ... normally given for a five-year period and then renewed thereafter." In August 2017, the Church of South India (CSI) decided to have a "non-cooperative stance" towards the Kerala Council of Churches (KCC), an ecumenical forum of non-Catholic Protestant Churches in Kerala, in protest against the KCC decision to provide membership to the Believers Church since the leader, Yohannan, claims to be a CSI bishop, a claim CSI denies.

There is also been an ongoing court case regarding the illegal filling in of wetlands in order to build the Believers Church Medical College Hospital. GFA has been paying a special tax because a "substantial" amount of its income is not used for intended purposes of the fundraising.  An Indian court said, "It is not in dispute that substantial income of the assessee trust was not used by both the assessees for the purposes for which they were formed." Moran Mor Athanasius Yohan Metropolitan (formerly known as K. P. Yohannan) says that the claims were politically motivated and that the workings of Gospel for Asia and Believers Church are transparent.

References

Bibliography
 Brodeur, Michael; Liebscher, Banning. (2013). Revival Culture: Prepare for the Next Great Awakening. Chapter 4. Gospel Light Publications. 
 Yohannan, K.P. (2004). Revolution in World Missions. Gospel for Asia Books. Carrollton, Texas.

External links
 
Docketbird Court Document
Final Order and Judgment
Settlement Agreement

Christian missions in India
Christian missions in Asia
Christian charities
Water-related charities